María Graciela Mendoza Barrios (born March 23, 1963) is a retired female race walker from Mexico.

Personal bests
10 km: 42:42 min –  Naumburg, 5 April 1997
20 km: 1:30:03 hrs –  Mézidon-Canon, 2 May 1999

International competitions

External links

1963 births
Living people
Mexican female racewalkers
Sportspeople from the State of Mexico
Athletes (track and field) at the 1987 Pan American Games
Athletes (track and field) at the 1991 Pan American Games
Athletes (track and field) at the 1995 Pan American Games
Athletes (track and field) at the 1999 Pan American Games
Athletes (track and field) at the 1992 Summer Olympics
Athletes (track and field) at the 1996 Summer Olympics
Athletes (track and field) at the 2000 Summer Olympics
Olympic athletes of Mexico
Pan American Games medalists in athletics (track and field)
Pan American Games gold medalists for Mexico
Central American and Caribbean Games gold medalists for Mexico
Competitors at the 1986 Central American and Caribbean Games
Competitors at the 1990 Central American and Caribbean Games
Competitors at the 1998 Central American and Caribbean Games
Central American and Caribbean Games medalists in athletics
Medalists at the 1991 Pan American Games
Medalists at the 1995 Pan American Games
Medalists at the 1999 Pan American Games
20th-century Mexican women